Ron Rash (born September 25, 1953), is an American poet, short story writer and novelist, is the Parris Distinguished Professor in Appalachian Cultural Studies at Western Carolina University.

Early life
Rash was born on September 25, 1953, in Chester, South Carolina and grew up in Boiling Springs, North Carolina. He is a graduate of Gardner-Webb University and Clemson University from which he holds a B.A. and M.A. in English, respectively.

Career
Rash's poems and stories have appeared in more than 100 magazines and journals. Serena received enthusiastic reviews across and beyond the United States and was a 2009 PEN/Faulkner Award Finalist.

Rash has achieved acclaim as a short story author,<ref>
{{citation
 | publisher = The Independent (UK)
 | date = August 21, 2011
 | title = Review of Burning Bright'' | url = https://www.independent.co.uk/arts-entertainment/books/reviews/burning-bright-by-ron-rash-2341115.html
 }}</ref> winning the Frank O'Connor Award in 2010 for Burning Bright.  Recent work such as The Outlaws (Oxford American, Summer, 2013) focused on ordinary lives in southern Appalachia. Jim Coby examined Rash's use of mystery thriller tropes in One Foot in Eden. While Rash's work certainly fits within the “Appalachian Noir” genre, a critic for the Atlanta Journal-Constitution has asserted that “Rash belongs to the loftier realm of literary fiction.” 

Ron Rash holds the John and Dorothy Parris Professorship in Appalachian Cultural Studies at Western Carolina University, where he teaches poetry and fiction in the Department of English.

List of works

Poetry
 Eureka Mill (1998)
 interweaves his family's personal migration from Buncombe County, NC farms with the broader portrait of mill life outside Chester, South Carolina
 Among the Believers (2000)

 Raising the Dead (2002)
 Deals with loss and displacement as a result of the flooding of Jocassee Valley, S.C.
 Waking (2011)

Short story collections
 The Night The New Jesus Fell to Earth and Other Stories from Cliffside, North Carolina (1994)Casualties (2000)

 Chemistry and Other Stories (2007)
 Thirteen short stories, eight of which were previously published in Casualties ("Chemistry," "Last Rite," "Not Waving But Drowning," "Overtime," "Cold Harbor", "Honesty", "Dangerous Love," "The Projectionist's Wife,"). Also includes the O. Henry Prize Winner "Speckled Trout" as well as "Pemberton's Bride," a story that gives a taste of Rash's forthcoming novel.
 Burning Bright (2010)
 Nothing Gold Can Stay (2013)
 Something Rich and Strange (2014)In the Valley (2020)
 Stories and a novella based on SerenaNovels
 One Foot in Eden (2002)
 Fleshes out the characters and themes of Raising the Dead. It tells the story of a community displaced disguised as a murder mystery and imbued with Rash's poetic language.
 Saints at the River (2004)
 About a South Carolina community torn over the issue of environmentalism.
 The World Made Straight (2006)
 Both a coming-of-age story set in the 1970s Appalachia and a meditation on the role of the past in the present, in this case a Civil War massacre that has divided Madison County, North Carolina. ever since.
 Adapted to a feature film, directed by David Burris, released in 2015.
 Serena (2008)
 The ambitious wife of a North Carolina timber baron, Serena, brings the spirit of Lady MacBeth to depression-era North Carolina.
 Adapted to a feature film, directed by Susanne Bier and starring Jennifer Lawrence and Bradley Cooper, released in 2014.
 The Cove (2012)
 A family is afflicted with a series of grave misfortunes. Their lives, particularly Laurel's, are interrupted at the arrival of a mute stranger who has been found after suffering a severe number of wasp stings.
 Above the Waterfall (2015)
 Set in contemporary Appalachia, about lives shaped by violence and a powerful connection to the land.The Risen (2016)

Children's bookThe Shark's Tooth (2001)

Magazine publicationsThe Woman at the Pond (The Southern Review, Vol. 46.4, 2010)The Outlaws (Oxford American, Summer, 2013)

Awards
 1987: General Electric Younger Writers Award 
 1996: The Sherwood Anderson Prize
 2002: Novello Literary Award (One Foot in Eden)
 2002: ForeWord Magazine's Gold Medal in Literary Fiction (One Foot in Eden)
 2002: Appalachian Book of the Year (One Foot in Eden)
 2004: Fiction Book of the Year by the Southern Book Critics Circle (Saints at the River) 
 2004: Fiction Book of the Year by the Southeastern Booksellers Association (Saints at the River) 
 2004: Weatherford Award for Best Novel of 2004 (Saints at the River) 
 2005: James Still Award from the Fellowship of Southern Writers 
 The Short story "Speckled Trout" was included in the 2005 O. Henry Prize Stories. This story formed the basis for the first chapter of The World Made Straight.
 2008: Finalist for the PEN/Faulkner Award for Fiction (Chemistry and Other Stories) 
 2009: Finalist for the PEN/Faulkner Award for Fiction (Serena) 
 2010: The Best American Short Stories 2010 for "The Ascent" 
 2010: Heasley Prize at Lyon College
 2010: Frank O'Connor International Short Story Award (Burning Bright) 
 2010: Inducted into the South Carolina Academy of Authors 
 2011: SIBA Book Award (Fiction) for Burning Bright 
 2012: David J. Langum, Sr. Prize in American Historical Fiction for The Cove 
 2018: The Best American Short Stories 2018 (Fiction) for "The Baptism" 

New York Times Bestseller listSerena was listed as #34 for Hardcover Fiction in the November 2, 2008 issue of The New York Times Book Review.The Cove was listed as #16 for Hardcover Fiction in the April 29, 2012 issue of The New York Times Book Review and remained on the list as #29, #22, and #31 for the three subsequent weeks.Nothing Gold Can Stay'' was listed as #28 for Hardcover Fiction in the March 10, 2013 issue of The New York Times Book Review.

References

External links
 Ron Rash's website 
 Ron Rash archive at the University of South Carolina Irvin Department of Rare Books and Special Collections.
 Saints at the River and Selected Poems
 Ron Rash Harper Collins Author Page
 Penguin Random House

1953 births
Living people
21st-century American novelists
American male novelists
Appalachian studies
Novelists from South Carolina
American male short story writers
21st-century American poets
American male poets
People from Chester, South Carolina
People from Boiling Springs, North Carolina
Gardner–Webb University alumni
Clemson University alumni
Novelists from North Carolina
20th-century American poets
Poets from South Carolina
20th-century American short story writers
21st-century American short story writers
PEN/Faulkner Award for Fiction winners
20th-century American male writers
21st-century American male writers